Kya Qusoor Hai Amala Ka? (What is Amala's fault?) is an Indian Hindi-language drama finite television series, which started telecasting from 3 April 2017 on Star Plus. Kya Qusoor Hai Amala Ka is an adaptation of the Turkish drama series Fatmagül'ün Suçu Ne?, which tackles the sensitive subject of sexual violence faced by women. The series is produced by 24 Frames Media. The series ended on 30 September 2017 with the discontinuation of the Star Plus afternoon programming block.

Plot 
Amala is a young and beautiful town girl, who lives in a small town of Dharamshala. She lost her parents at an early age, thus she lives with her elder brother Raghu and his wife Mandkini. She is engaged to her childhood friend Dev and is waiting to get married. She dreams of having her own house, where she can live her life according to her will.

Abeer is a well mannered guy who lives with his adoptive mother Karuna, who is a healer of herbal medicines.
One night, Amala on the way to see off her fiancé who is departing for a working trip was caught and gang-raped by Abeer's rich friends Suveer, Evan and Viraj under the influence of drugs & alcohol. While Abeer is unaware of the reality, he finds himself guilty for the incident.

Abeer is forced to marry Amala by the powerful family of his rich friends. Amala and Abeer move to Mumbai, after marriage, to start a new life. Raghu and Mandakini, along with their kid Mannu, reach Mumbai to stay with Amala and Abeer. They are later joined by Abeer's adoptive mother, Karuna. Dev too reaches Mumbai with a motive to seek answers to his questions from Amala. He calls Abeer and threatens to kill him as he snatched away his love from him. Amala falls ill and Mando is suspicious if she is pregnant. Amala performs the test at home, and it comes out to be positive. This comes as a shock to them with Amala in a deep pain, and Abeer tensed, not knowing what to do. Karuna takes Amala to the hospital to get the test done again. The reports come out negative, and it is revealed that Amala is not pregnant, which comes as a relief to everyone. Fearing that Dev might turn into a criminal by taking his vengeance from Amala's culprits, Amala asks Abeer to leave her forever as she doesn't want him to destroy Dev's life, like he destroyed her life. Abeer wants to leave Amala and move abroad, for her own good, but at the same time his increasing concern and love for Amala is shown. A guilt-stricken Viraj tells Abeer the truth of his innocence, and him not being a rapist like them, on realising how he betrayed his own friend due to his selfishness. Abeer gets heartbroken by the truth, and later, decides to tell this to Amala. After several unrewarding attempts to express his innocence to Amala, Abeer gets successful in telling her this truth, but Amala ends up blaming him more. She tells how him and his friends have broken her beyond repair. She says that she hates herself and her life, and also, she has nothing but hatred for him too.
Mando & Karuna leave for Dharamshala. Abeer accompanies Amala for her nephew's school admission. He convinces the principal to give the child a seat in the school. On their way back, Dev sees Amala but does not approach her. 
Abeer is slowly falling in love with Amala despite her hatred for him. The next day Raghu is lost in the shopping mall and Abeer goes looking for him. 
Meanwhile, Evan and Viraj are out of jail. Viraj is guilt stricken and resorts to drinking to forget his crimes. Surveer & Mahi's wedding is postponed by Manvendar. Mahi wants to find out the truth so she goes to Amla. After Abeer supports Amla, she finally gets the courage to expose her rapists because she does not want Mahi's life to get ruined because she didn't tell her the truth. At this time, Evaan has figured out that Amla is coming to expose them, he hires goons to come and kill Abeer and Amla. Abeer and Amla successfully fight the goons back and they reach the wedding venue, the Malik house. There the Maliks have set up extra security in order for them to not enter the wedding. Amla successfully exposes the three rapists and the wedding is called off. Later Evaan marries Mahi to revenge from Rishan. Also Amla files a case against Evaan, Suveer, and Viraj. Abeer has no action taken against him because he was innocent and he supported Amla. All three of the guys and sentenced to life time imprisonment. Rishan Malik, Suveer's father, shoots himself because of his sons actions and the humiliation he would have to face. Amla finally gets justice and Abeer and Amla live happily together.

Production 
Popular Turkish series Fatmagül'ün Suçu Ne? was dubbed in Hindi and broadcast in India in 2016 on Zindagi TV after the success of teen-age romance drama Feriha. Both the series achieved a rating success which in turn caused many other popular Turkish shows like Kuzey Guney, A Love Story and Little Lord to be shown in India in dubbed form. Subsequently 24 Frames television production company acquired rights of the series from Eccho Rights to be remade in India with show's original creators giving important input for the remake. The show was developed by Purnendu Shekhar, Nandita Mehra and Bhairavi Raichura of 24 Frames. The initial phase of the show is set in Dharamshala and the crew shot on location for a month in Himachal Pradesh.Pankhuri Awasthy Rode of Razia Sultan fame was cast as the lead role of Amala (Fatmagul) and debutant Rajveer Singh was cast as the male lead role of Abeer (Kerim).

Amitabh Bacchan provided monologue for the series and appeared in a promo promoting the show and speaking about awareness of how victims of rape are constantly ostracised.

Cast

International broadcasting

References

External links
 Kya Qusoor Hai Amla Ka? Streaming on Hotstar
 

2017 Indian television series debuts
2017 Indian television series endings
Hindi-language television shows
Indian television soap operas
Indian drama television series
Television shows set in Mumbai
StarPlus original programming
Television shows set in Himachal Pradesh
Indian television series based on non-Indian television series
Rape in television
Rape in India
Non-Turkish television series based on Turkish television series